Molly and Mack is a British children's television series that began airing on CBeebies in 2018. It ran for five seasons.

The show airs on ABC Kids in Australia.

Premise
The show centres around an 11-year-old girl named Molly (played by Mimi Robertson) who spends the summer helping her 19-year-old brother Mack (played by Joshua Haynes) at a toy stall in The Big Hub, a community hall in the fictional Scottish town of Bridgetown.

The Big Hub, managed by Moira (played by Maureen Carr), is where a variety of stallholders hold an array of permanent market stalls including a gift stall run by Alice (played by Katrina Bryan), a fruit and vegetable stall run by resident handyman Bob (played by Steven McNicoll) and a café stall run by Mrs Juniper (played by Alison Peebles).

The kids club at The Big Hub is managed by Molly and Mack's widower father James (played by James Mackenzie). James is regularly seen supervising a number of children including Molly's friends, Suki (played by Miko Hanley), Magnus (played by Ethan Rowley) and Ruby (played by Freya Reid).

Mack's girlfriend Daisy (played by Danielle Jam) works at a nearby veterinary surgery.

Songs
During each episode, there are always two songs performed as a regular problem-solving plot device. When identifying a problem, a character performs The Oops Song, before another character sings The Idea Song when they propose a solution as a way to solve the problem.

 The Oops Song: sometimes Molly, Alice, Moria, Sandy, Mrs Juniper sings The Oops Song.

Episodes

Production
With a multicultural cast, Molly and Mack is filmed in Govan in Glasgow and North Queensferry in Fife, with the Forth Bridge being used as a centrepiece for the fictional Bridgetown. The bridge is heavily featured in the opening sequence of the show, in various on-location shots and promotional material for the series. The building featured as “The Hub” is in Maxwell Park - and is called Pollokshields Burgh Hall.

References

External links
 
 

2018 British television series debuts
2022 British television series endings
2010s British children's television series
2010s preschool education television series
British preschool education television series
BBC children's television shows
CBeebies
English-language television shows
Television series about children
Television series by BBC Studios
Television shows set in Scotland